St Peter's Church, Prickwillow, is an inactive Anglican church in the village of Prickwillow, Cambridgeshire, England.

History 
Built in 1866–8 of brick on a foundation of wooden piles by R R Rowe. The church has a nave, central bell turret, transepts, and south porch. The elaborately carved font of Italian marble, perhaps from Carrara, was given to Ely Cathedral by Dean Spencer in 1693. The font cover is hung from the ceiling by the figure of an angel. After the church was declared redundant in 2011, the font was returned to the cathedral.  The 1691 bell, was also given by Ely Cathedral The baptism register starts in 1874 and the marriages in 1864. There is no graveyard as nearby Ely is used.

References

Bibliography

External links 
 

19th-century architecture
Churches in Cambridgeshire